LPL Financial Holdings, Inc. (commonly referred to as LPL Financial) was founded in 1989 and is considered the largest independent broker-dealer in the United States. As of 2021 the company had more than 17,500 financial advisors, over US$1 trillion in advisory & brokerage assets, and generated approximately $5.9 billion in annual revenue for the 2020 fiscal year.

LPL Financial was formed in 1989 through the merger of two brokerage firms—Linsco (established in 1968) and Private Ledger (established in 1973)—and has since expanded its number of independent financial advisors both organically and through acquisitions.  LPL Financial has main offices in Boston, Fort Mill, Austin, and San Diego. The company is a member of FINRA and the SIPC.

LPL Financial joined the Fortune 500 list at number 466 in 2021.

LPL's subsidiaries are LPL Financial LLC, LPL Insurance Associates, Inc., Fortigent, LLC, and The Private Trust Company, N.A.

Acquisitions 
On December 3, 2018, LPL Financial Holdings Inc. reported its acquisition of AdvisoryWorld, a technology company serving the wealth management industry. Founded in 1987, the company's products include proposal generation, portfolio and investment analytics and portfolio modeling capabilities.

On August 18, 2020, LPL Financial Holdings Inc. reported its purchase of E.K. Riley Investments, LLC, a broker-dealer and registered investment advisor (RIA) based in Seattle. E.K. Riley served more than $2 billion of client assets and expected approximately 90% of its advisors to join LPL.

On August 20, 2020, LPL Financial Holdings Inc. reported it has completed its purchase of the properties of San Diego-based Lucia Securities, a broker-dealer and registered investment advisor (RIA). The deal was arranged as an acquisition of properties, which completed on 18 August 2020.

On October 27, 2020, LPL Financial Holdings Inc. announced its acquisition of Blaze Portfolio, a Chicago-based fintech firm founded in 2010. LPL will continue to offer Blaze Portfolio's services as a stand-alone product, as well as bringing the trading capabilities to all LPL Financial advisors. The transaction was signed and closed on Oct. 26, 2020. LPL Financial paid approximately $12 million and agreed to a potential contingent payment of up to $5 million subject to milestones and customary purchase price adjustments.

Statistics
Key facts regarding LPL Financial include the following:

 4.5 million funded accounts
 17,287 financial professionals
 Approximately 4,500 technology, custody, and clearing service subscribers
 Approximately 800 financial institution partners
 $903 billion in advisory and brokerage assets as of December 2020

Legal
On May 2, 2018, LPL Financial agreed to a $26 million settlement arising from unregistered securities.

On October 30, 2018, LPL Financial agreed to pay a $2.75 million fine and perform a look-back review of certain complaints primarily related to anti-money-laundering (AML) reporting and customer complaint reporting.

On June 26, 2019, LPL Financial settled with the Commonwealth of Massachusetts at a cost of $1.1. million and a review of certain internal controls. The Massachusetts Securities Division (MSD) had investigated and charged LPL over compliance matters related to licensing of advisors/supervisors and late reportings.

On December 26, 2019, LPL Financial paid a fine of $300,000 as part of a settlement with FINRA primarily related to its systems and procedures related to Uniform Gifts to Minors Act (UGMA) and Uniform Transfer to Minors Act (UTMA) accounts. The settlement was based on internal controls and was not related to any investor harm.

On December 30, 2020, LPL Financial paid a fine of $6.5 million as part of a settlement with the Financial Industry Regulatory Authority (FINRA). As part of the settlement, LPL Financial consented to the findings that they had failed to supervise and failed to maintain adequate records. FINRA alleged that inadequate recordkeeping had exposed customers to losses through a Ponzi scheme created by one of its representatives.

References

External links

Financial services companies of the United States
Companies based in San Diego
Companies listed on the Nasdaq
Brokerage firms